Scarborough—Rouge Park is a provincial electoral district in Scarborough, Toronto. It elects one member to the Legislative Assembly of Ontario. This riding was created in 2015.

Members of Provincial Parliament

Election results

References

External links
Map of riding for 2018 election

Provincial electoral districts of Toronto
Scarborough, Toronto